KVSJ-FM is a radio station licensed by the Peace and Justice Network of San Joaquin County broadcasting on 89.5 FM from Tracy, California. It went on the air as KYNJ on August 30, 2010, but later changed its call sign to KBCC on July 31, 2017, and to KVSJ-FM on June 16, 2020.

References

External links

VSJ-FM
Radio stations established in 2013
2013 establishments in California
Tracy, California
Mass media in San Joaquin County, California